Omar Strong Sr. (born May 16, 1990) is an American professional basketball player for the Windsor Express of the NBL Canada. In 2012–13, he was a senior at Texas Southern University and was named the Southwestern Athletic Conference Player of the Year.

Early life 
Strong was born on May 16, 1990 and brought up in Baltimore, Maryland.

High school career
Strong attended Fredrick Douglass High School in Baltimore, Maryland. Playing the point guard position, he averaged 22 points, four assists and three steals per game as a senior in 2007–08. That year Frederick Douglass won the Baltimore city title. Strong was named to The Baltimore Sun All-Metro team in each of his final two seasons.

Collegiate career

Junior college
Due to poor academic performance, Strong was unable to commit to a four-year college basketball program right out of high school. He enrolled at Cecil College, a junior college in Maryland, to work on his academics while also gain some playing experience at the next level. He played for Cecil in 2008–09, took one season off to focus solely on school, then re-joined the team in 2010–11. Numerous mid-major universities offered him scholarships after his second season at Cecil. Strong ultimately chose to play for the Texas Southern Tigers, citing "I think I'll have a better experience if I go away."

Texas Southern
In 2011–12, his junior year, Strong led the Tigers in scoring. He guided them to the Southwestern Athletic Conference (SWAC) Tournament championship game, where the winner gains an automatic berth into the NCAA Tournament, but Texas Southern lost 71–69 to Mississippi Valley State; Strong scored 30 points in the loss. At the end of the season he was named to the All-SWAC Second Team.

Strong finished his collegiate career upon the conclusion of the 2012–13 season. He finished second in the conference in scoring with 17.0 points per game, made a school-record 120 three-pointers, and led the SWAC in free throw percentage (84.8%). The Tigers went 16–2 in conference games en route to being the regular season conference champion, and Strong was named the SWAC Player of the Year in addition to a First Team all-conference bid.

Professional career 
In February 2014 Strong signed a contract with Bulgarian club Beroe. He scored a season-high 24 points in a game against Spartak Pleven. He appeared in 9 games throughout the season, averaging 14.7 points, 1.6 rebounds and 1.8 assists per game. He joined Mississauga Power of NBL Canada for the 2014–15 season. On January 11, 2015 Strong scored a career-high 44 points against the Island Storm, also setting the franchise record in scoring. In the same match Strong set a league-high for NBL Canada in three point shots making 11.  In 29 regular season games, Strong averaged 18.7 points, 2.8 rebounds and 2.6 assists per game on 32.7 minutes per game. On April 13, 2015, Strong was named Sixth Man of the Year of the NBL Canada. According to him, Mississauga Power head coach Kyle Julius "really saw something in him". He was named in the All-NBL Canada Second-team for the 2014–15 season. By the end of the 2014–15 season, he became the Power's all-time leader in three-pointers, with 148, passing Nick Okorie, who had 141.

On July 1, 2015, Strong signed with UJAP Quimper 29 of the Nationale Masculine 1 (NM1) in France.

On February 6, 2018, Strong signed with the Windsor Express of the National Basketball League of Canada.

Strong has competed in The Basketball Tournament, an annual winner-take-all team competition. In 2015, he competed for Team City of Gods, who made it to the semifinals before losing to eventual champion Overseas Elite. In 2021, he competed for B1 Ballers, who lost in the first round to Golden Eagles; he later won the tournament's "33-Point Contest", and a $33,333.33 prize, by besting seven other players in an individual competition to make 11 three-point field goals the fastest.

Personal 
Strong is the father of Omar Strong Jr., for whom he planned to return to Baltimore while in college. He said, "It's just like I know what I came up from. I want him to have everything I didn't and much more. If I'm [struggling to get] through something, I just think about my son and get through it." Strong often uses his son for motivation and inspiration.

References

External links
Omar Strong college stats @ sports-reference.com

1990 births
Living people
American expatriate basketball people in Bulgaria
American expatriate basketball people in Canada
American expatriate basketball people in France
American men's basketball players
Basketball players from Baltimore
BC Beroe players
Junior college men's basketball players in the United States
Mississauga Power players
Niagara River Lions players
Point guards
Texas Southern Tigers men's basketball players
UJAP Quimper 29 players
Windsor Express players